Bernard James Murphy  (27 December 1918 – 22 May 1974) was a Canadian-born Roman Catholic bishop.

Murphy was ordained as a Catholic priest in 1944; and served as the Bishop of the Roman Catholic Diocese of Hamilton in Bermuda from 1967 to 1974.

References

1918 births
Bermudian Roman Catholic bishops
20th-century Canadian Roman Catholic priests
1974 deaths
Resurrectionist Congregation
20th-century Roman Catholic bishops in British Overseas Territories
Roman Catholic bishops of Hamilton in Bermuda